Wyoming Highway 22 (WYO 22) is a  state highway in the U.S. State of Wyoming known as the Teton Pass Highway in Teton County Wyoming. WYO 22 spans  from Idaho State Highway 33 at the Idaho-Wyoming state line to the concurrency of U.S. Routes 26, 89, 189, and 191 in Jackson.

Route description

After the Idaho-Wyoming state line, WYO 22 becomes Teton Pass, later passing through the community of Wilson, a census-designated place (CDP) west of Jackson. WYO 22 then continues east to Jackson where it ends at U.S. Highway 26/89/189/191 (Broadway).

History 
WYO 22 used to connect to former Alternate US 20, which began at U.S. Highway 20 in Sugar City, Idaho, following Idaho State Highway 33 until the state line, then connected with WYO 22. Alternate US 20 used to end at the state line, where it was redesignated as WYO 22, as Wyoming did not extend the route into the state. If that route had been extended, it would have taken over the entire route of WYO 22, to then overlap U.S. Highway 26 until it reached U.S. Highway 20 in Shoshoni.

Major intersections

See also

 List of state highways in Wyoming
 List of highways numbered 22

References

External links

 Wyoming Routes 00-99
 WYO 22 - US 26/US 89/US 189/US 191 to WYO 390
 WYO 22- WYO 390 to ID 33/Idaho State Line

Transportation in Teton County, Wyoming
022
U.S. Route 20